Bladel is a municipality and town in the province of North Brabant, Southern Netherlands. In 2019, it had a population of 20,175.

Population centres

Topography

Dutch Topographic map of the municipality of Bladel, 2013.

Notable residents

 Jan Renier Snieders (1812 in Bladel – 1888) a Flemish writer
 August Snieders (1825 in Bladel – 1904) a Flemish journalist and writer
 Corky de Graauw (born 1951 in Bladel) a former Dutch ice hockey player, competed at the 1980 Winter Olympics
 Alain van Katwijk (born 1979 in Bladel) a former Dutch cyclist
 Roy Beerens (born 1987 in Bladel) a Dutch professional footballer with 320 club caps

Gallery

References

External links

Official website

 
Municipalities of North Brabant
Populated places in North Brabant
Municipalities of the Netherlands established in 1997